Ante Pavlović is a Croatian retired footballer who played in the Croatian First Football League, and Canadian Professional Soccer League.

Playing career 
Pavlović played in the Croatian First Football League in 2001 with NK Zadar. In 2004, he went abroad to play in the Canadian Professional Soccer League with Toronto Croatia. In his debut season he won the CPSL Championship after defeating Vaughan Shooters. The following season he assisted in clinching a postseason berth by finishing second in the Eastern Conference.

References 

Year of birth missing (living people)
Living people
Association football defenders
Croatian footballers
NK Zadar players
Toronto Croatia players
Croatian Football League players
Canadian Soccer League (1998–present) players
Croatian expatriate footballers
Expatriate soccer players in Canada
Croatian expatriate sportspeople in Canada